Spathognathodus is an extinct conodont genus in the family Spathognathodontidae. It is a non-Platform conodont, from the Pennsylvanian (Carboniferous).

References

External links 

 Spathognathodus at fossilworks.org (retrieved 4 May 2016)

Ozarkodinida genera
Pennsylvanian conodonts
Fossil taxa described in 1941
Taxa named by Edward Branson
Taxa named by Maurice Mehl
Paleozoic life of Yukon